James Frazier Barker (born May 1, 1947) is the former president of Clemson University.

Early life and education
Barker was born in Kingsport, Tennessee and graduated from Dobyns-Bennett High School.  He attended Clemson University and graduated with a degree in architecture in 1970.  He then attended Washington University in St. Louis, earning a master's degree in architecture in 1973.

Academic career
Following graduation, Barker was an assistant professor of architecture at the University of Tennessee, before moving to Mississippi State University in 1974.  In 1984 he became dean of architecture at Mississippi State.  Barker became dean of architecture at Clemson University in 1986, a position he held until his election as president in 1999.

President of Clemson
Barker served as President of Clemson from 1999 to 2014.  In his inaugural address, Barker stated a goal of having Clemson ranked in the Top 20 public universities, as ranked by U.S. News & World Report.  During his tenure, Clemson's U.S. News ranking has risen from #38 to #22. Barker has overseen the creation of the Clemson University International Center for Automotive Research and the Restoration Institute in North Charleston (including a $98 million wind turbine research center).

Barker also has served as the chair of the NCAA Division I board of directors from 2007 until 2010,  and commissioner (2002–2004) and chair (2004–2006) of the Southern Association of Colleges and Schools.

In January 2013 Barker underwent five heart bypass surgeries. On April 16, 2013, he announced plans to retire and return full-time to the classroom.  James P. Clements replaced him as president on January 1, 2014.

References

1947 births
Living people
Clemson University alumni
Clemson University faculty
Mississippi State University faculty
Presidents of Clemson University
University of Tennessee faculty
Sam Fox School of Design & Visual Arts alumni
Fellows of the American Institute of Architects
People from Kingsport, Tennessee